Paul Hugo Wilhelm Hensel (17 May 1860, Groß-Barthen near Königsberg – 11 November 1930, Erlangen) was a German philosopher.

Biography

Hensel was born in Groß-Barten near Königsberg, Prussia. He was the son of the landowner and entrepreneur Sebastian Hensel, brother of the mathematician Kurt Hensel, grandson of the composer Fanny Mendelssohn and the painter Wilhelm Hensel. Fanny was the sister of Felix Mendelssohn Bartholdy, daughter of Abraham Mendelssohn Bartholdy, and granddaughter of philosopher Moses Mendelssohn, and entrepreneur Daniel Itzig. Both of Hensel's paternal grandmothers and his mother were from Jewish families that had converted to Christianity.

Hensel became a professor of philosophy at Heidelberg and Erlangen, where he taught until 1928. At Erlangen, Hensel was the supervisor of Hans Reichenbach's PhD dissertation on the theory of probability.

Works 
 Über die Beziehung des reinen Ich bei Fichte zur Einheit der Apperception bei Kant [On the relationship between Fichte's pure I and Kant's unity of apperception], 1885 (doctoral thesis under Alois Riehl)
 Ethisches Wissen und ethisches Handeln, 1889
 Hauptprobleme der Ethik, 1903
 Kleine Schriften und Vorträge, 1930

References

External links 
 
 
 
 Probleme/Projekte/Prozesse: Hochzeit im Hause Mendelssohn at www.luise-berlin.de
 AIM25: Thesaurus-assisted Personal Name search at www.aim25.ac.uk

1860 births
1930 deaths
19th-century German people
20th-century German people
19th-century philosophers
20th-century German philosophers
Hensel family
German people of Jewish descent
People from the Province of Prussia
People from East Prussia
People from Erlangen